The 2002 World Ringette Championships (2002 WRC) was an international ringette tournament and the 6th (XI) World Ringette Championships. The tournament was organized by the International Ringette Federation (IRF) and was contested in Edmonton, Alberta, Canada, between November 25 and November 30, 2002, at the Northlands AgriCom Arena, now called the Edmonton Expo Centre. The final match was broadcast in Canada and followed by over 140,000 televiewers.

Overview
The 2002 victory by Team Canada was considered particularly notable. In 2000, Team Canada was defeated by a score of 4–3 in extra time against Team Finland, but in WRC 2002, Team Canada took its revenge by defeating their arch-rival by a score of 3–1 in front of a sell-out crowd of 3850 supporters. The final match was broadcast in Canada by the Canadian Broadcasting Corporation (CBC) and followed by 144,000 Canadian televiewers.

Alberta Sports Hall of Fame and Ringette Canada Hall of Fame inductee, Phyllis Sadoway, was the assistant coach of Team Canada in 2002.

Venue

Teams

Final standings

Rosters

Team Finland
The 2002 Team Finland team competed at 2002 WRC.

Team Canada
The 2002 Team Canada Senior team competed in the 2002 World Ringette Championships. The 2002 Team Canada team included the following:

See also
 World Ringette Championships
 International Ringette Federation
  Canada national ringette team
  Finland national ringette team
  Sweden national ringette team
  United States national ringette team

References

World Ringette Championships
Ringette
Ringette competitions